The first case of COVID-19 in the U.S. state of New York during the pandemic was confirmed on March 1, 2020, and the state quickly became an epicenter of the pandemic, with a record 12,274 new cases reported on April 4 and approximately 29,000 more deaths reported for the month of April than the same month in 2019. By April 10, New York had more confirmed cases than any country outside the US. , the state has reported 126.8 million tests, with 6,557,018 cumulative cases, and 77,761 deaths.

New York had the highest number of confirmed cases of any state from the start of U.S. outbreak until July 22, 2020, when it was first surpassed by California and later by Florida and Texas. Approximately half of the state's reported cases have been in New York City, where around 40 percent of the state's population lives.

Despite the high number of reported cases in March and April, by May 7, New York had reduced the rate of increase of new cases to less than 1 percent per day, and since June 6 to less than 0.25 percent per day. Unlike many other states, New York did not see a spike or "second wave" in the daily new case rate during the summer months. On June 17, Governor Andrew Cuomo announced that New York had the lowest infection rate in the United States. In late September, New York began to see an uptick in cases, with over 1,000 new cases reported in a single day for the first time since early June on September 26.

, the state of New York had the fourth highest number of confirmed cases in the United States, and the 34th highest number of confirmed cases per capita. , it has the fourth-highest count of deaths related to the virus, surpassed by California, Florida, and Texas; and seventh-highest count per capita, behind New Jersey and several Southern and Western states, such as Mississippi, Alabama, Arizona, Louisiana and Oklahoma. In February 2021, the New York COVID-19 nursing home scandal surfaced, which drew huge criticism on Governor Cuomo's decision on withholding reports of nusing home deaths.

Government response to the pandemic in New York began with a full lockdown from March 2020 to April 2020, followed by a four-phase reopening plan by region from April 2020 to July 2020. Additional modifications to the plan have been imposed since July as the state has learned more about the pandemic and due to political pressure. In October 2020, a micro-cluster strategy was announced which shuts down areas of the state to varying degrees by ZIP code when cases increase.

, New York has administered 41,044,869 COVID-19 vaccine doses, and has fully vaccinated 15,265,493 people, equivalent to 78 percent of the population.

Origins
Genetic analysis confirmed that most cases of the virus had mutations indicating a European origin, meaning travelers flying to New York City from Europe brought the virus. Americans visiting Italy in late February and returning to New York on March 1 were not asked by customs if they had spent time in Italy, even though the State Department had urged Americans not to travel to Italy on February 29 (the same day Italy reported 1,100 COVID cases). According to statistical models, New York City already had 600 COVID-19 cases in mid-February, and as many as 10,000 cases by March 1.

Timeline

March 1, 2020, saw the first confirmed case of COVID-19 in New York State, a 39-year-old female health care worker who lived in Manhattan, who had returned from Iran on February 25 with no symptoms at the time. She went into home isolation with her husband.

On March 3, a second case was confirmed, a lawyer in his 50s who lived in New Rochelle, Westchester County, immediately north of New York City, and worked in Midtown Manhattan at a law firm within One Grand Central Place. He had traveled to Miami in February, but had not visited areas known to have widespread transmission of the coronavirus. Two of his four children had recently returned from Israel. After first feeling ill on February 22, he was admitted to a hospital in Westchester on February 27, diagnosed with pneumonia, and released from isolation after testing negative for the flu. Instances of panic buying in New York were reported after his case was confirmed.

On March 4, the number of cases in New York State increased to 11 as nine people linked to the lawyer tested positive, including his wife, a son, a daughter, a neighbor, and a friend and his family.

On March 5, New York City mayor Bill de Blasio said that coronavirus fears should not keep New Yorkers off the subway, riding from Fulton Street to High Street in a public press attempt to demonstrate the subway's safety.

On March 6, eleven new cases were reported, bringing the state caseload to 33. All the new cases were tied to the first community transmission case, the lawyer. At the end of the day, an additional 11 new cases were reported by the governor, bringing the total caseload to 44, with 8 of the new cases in Westchester County, and 3 in Nassau County on Long Island. Also on March 6, an article appeared in the New York Post stating that while Mayor de Blasio assigned responsibility for the lack of N95 masks and other personal protective equipment to the federal government, the city never ordered the supplies until that date.

On March 7, Governor Andrew Cuomo declared a state of emergency in New York after 89 cases had been confirmed in the state, 70 of them in Westchester County, 12 in New York City and 7 elsewhere.

On March 8, the state reported 16 new confirmed cases and a total of 106 cases statewide. New York City issued new commuter guidelines amid the current outbreak, asking sick individuals to stay off public transit, encouraging citizens to avoid densely packed buses, subways, or trains.

On March 9, Mayor de Blasio announced that there were 16 confirmed cases of COVID-19 in New York City. On March 10, Governor Cuomo announced a containment zone in the city of New Rochelle from March 12 to 25.

On March 11, Cuomo announced that the City University of New York and State University of New York schools would be closed for the following week, from March 12 to 19. These college systems would move most classes to an online-based system starting March 19, and continuing through the rest of the spring semester. Dormitories will remain open for students "who cannot return home for hardship reasons." Also on March 11, a man in Monroe County tested positive, making it the first county in Western New York to have a COVID-19 case. Officials said he flew into JFK from Italy, traveled on a Greyhound bus from Manhattan to Rochester, and arrived locally the morning of March 10. The bus continued on to Buffalo and Toronto.

On March 12, the first two cases were confirmed in Albany County, leading Albany mayor Kathy Sheehan to suspend the annual St. Patrick's Day parade. The same day, a staff member at Union College tested positive for coronavirus in Schenectady County, marking the county's first case.

On March 13, Herkimer County saw its first confirmed case but declined to disclose the patient's location. The patient later was revealed to have been from the Mohawk/Ilion area, just south of Herkimer, the county seat.

On March 14, the first two fatalities in the state occurred. An 82-year-old woman in Brooklyn with pre-existing emphysema died in the hospital. A 65-year-old person with other significant health problems who had not previously been tested for COVID-19 died at their home in Suffern, Rockland County. It was also announced that three people in Erie County tested positive for COVID-19. Orange County, Dutchess County and Ulster County closed down all their schools.

On March 15, the third fatality in the state was announced. A 79-year-old woman with underlying health issues died, who had been admitted to a New York City hospital.

On March 16, Clinton County reported its first case, at CVPH Medical Center in Plattsburgh. No further information has been revealed about the patient. Confirmed cases increased by 4,000 between March 22 and 23, which brought the total number of confirmed cases statewide to nearly 21,000. 12,305 of these were in New York City.

On March 24, Cuomo said, "The apex is higher than we thought and the apex is sooner than we thought." He warned there was not enough assistance from the federal government and that the state had 25,000 cases and at least 210 deaths. 211 NYPD officers and civilian employees have tested positive for COVID-19. In total, 2,774 NYPD employees, 7.6 percent of the workforce, were sick. There were approximately 4,000 positive cases in Westchester County by March 24, and more than 15,000 confirmed cases by April 9.

On March 26, 2020, Cuomo announced that the state would allow two patients to share one ventilator using a technique he called "splitting," where a second set of tubes would be added to the ventilator. COVID-19 patients need ventilators for between 11 and 21 days, while under normal circumstances patients usually only require them for three to four days. He also said the state was considering converting anesthesia machines to use as ventilators. Between March 25 and March 26, there were 100 deaths statewide, with the number of hospitalized patients increasing by 40 percent in New York City.

Researchers at Cornell University created an interactive map to visualize the spread of COVID-19 in New York State.

On January 4, 2021, a confirmed case of a new, more contagious SARS-CoV-2 variant from the United Kingdom was reported in New York. The patient is a man in his sixties from Saratoga County in upstate New York, who had no travel history to the United Kingdom. As of March 2, 2021, 286 sequences in the B.1.1.7 lineage have been detected in New York.

On July 22, 2021, 31 out of 550 campers at sleep-away Camp Pontiac in upstate New York tested positive. All were under the age of 12, making them too young to receive a COVID-19 vaccine in the United States.

Impact on health care

Shortage of protective gear and medical equipment

After trying to purchase 200,000 N95 masks on February 7, 2020, the Office of Emergency Management learned that vendors were out of stock. Emergency provisions of masks and hand sanitizers did not arrive until early March. One medical supply vendor with standing city contracts said that the initial requests for protective gear from the Department of Citywide Administrative Services (DCAS) were bogged down by inefficient bureaucratic delays. One vendor said, "We'd send them a list of products we can deliver within 24, 48 hours," but on average it took 72 hours for the agency to place an order. He added "the city just moves so slow" when there was very high demand coming from hospitals and the private sector. According to the contractor, eight out of 10 supply orders could not be filled because DCAS did not pay on time, which a spokeswoman for New York City denied. The office of the comptroller approved 12 contracts with a total value of $150 million before the mayor's office took over the process on March 16. Mayor de Blasio said that the city might run out of supplies by April if the federal government did not send 3 million N95 masks, 50 million surgical masks, 15,000 ventilators, and 45 million surgical gowns, gloves, and face shields.

One EMS worker expressed frustration at being asked to wear the less-effective surgical masks. The police union filed a complaint on March 13 due to NYPD officers not being given masks and other protective gear. A spokeswoman called the Police Benevolent Association's complaint "empty rhetoric".

New York gave a $69 million contract to a Silicon Valley engineer to provide 1,000 ventilators. The ventilators were never delivered. As of May 5, New York was seeking a refund. The engineer's name had been supplied by federal officials, and they had received it from volunteers in the office of Jared Kushner, senior advisor to President Donald Trump. According to the New York Times, it appears the engineer had not been vetted by anyone.

Paramedic shortages
On March 28, 2020, The New York Times reported that the city's 911 emergency response system was "overwhelmed" due to the large number of coronavirus patients needing transport to the hospital. Dispatchers received more than 7,000 calls on March 26, a record since the September 11 attacks. Emergency workers had to decide which cases to prioritize, and some patients were being left at home without medical care. In addition, paramedics lacked sufficient protective gear.

Testing
The private corporations responsible for testing have a limited testing capacity. Eventually, their testing capacity will reach a bottleneck where it becomes increasingly difficult to conduct more tests per day. Backlogs for test results continue to increase in multiple states such as California, where it can take weeks to receive test results.

The FDA has approved New York state to authorize the state's 28 public and private labs to begin manual, semi-automated and automated testing for novel coronavirus, or COVID-19. The approval allows the state to dramatically increase testing capacity to thousands of tests per day. The approval also extends to the Roche high-volume platform for testing. New York State's Wadsworth Lab has developed a new, less intrusive test for COVID-19. The new test is done through a saliva sample and a self-administered short nasal swab in the presence of a healthcare professional. Additionally, health care professionals can self-administer the test without another health care professional present.

Government response

Vaccination
On January 8, 2021, Governor Cuomo published an initial list of New Yorkers eligible to receive the COVID-19 vaccine.

Phase 1A

Health Care Workers

 High-risk hospital workers (emergency room workers, ICU staff and Pulmonary Department staff)
 Federally Qualified Health Center employees
 Emergency Medical Services (EMS) workers
 Coroners, medical examiners and certain funeral workers
 Urgent Care providers
 People administering COVID-19 vaccines, including local health department staff
 All Outpatient/Ambulatory frontline, high-risk health care workers of any age who provide direct in-person patient care
 All staff who are in direct contact with patients (such as reception staff)
 All frontline, high-risk public health workers who have direct contact with patients, including those conducting COVID-19 tests, handling COVID-19 specimens and COVID-19 vaccinations

This includes, but is not limited to:

 Doctors who work in private medical practices and their staff
 Doctors who work in hospital-affiliated medical practices and their staff
 Doctors who work in public health clinics and their staff
 Registered Nurses
 Specialty medical practices of all types
 Dentists and Orthodontists and their staff
 Psychiatrists and Psychologists and their staff
 Physical Therapists and their staff
 Optometrists and their staff
 Pharmacists and Pharmacy Aides
 Home care workers
 Hospice workers

Residents and Staff in Certain Group Living Facilities

 Nursing homes and other congregate care facilities
 NYS Office of Mental Health, Office People with Developmental Disabilities, and Office of Addiction Services and Supports facilities

Phase 1B as of January, 2021

Older Adults

 People aged 75 and older

Grocery Workers

 Public-facing grocery store workers

First Responders and Support Staff for First Responder Agencies

 Fire Service 
 State Fire Service, including firefighters and investigators (professional and volunteer)
 Local Fire Services, including firefighters and investigators (professional and volunteer)
 Police and Investigations 
 State Police, including Troopers
 State Park Police, DEC Police, Forest Rangers
 SUNY Police
 Sheriffs' Offices
 County Police Departments and Police Districts
 City, Town and Village Police Departments
 Transit of other Public Authority Police Departments
 State Field Investigations, including Department of Motor Vehicles, State Commission of Correction, Justice Center, Department of Financial Services, Inspector General, Department of Tax and Finance, Office of Children and Family Services and State Liquor Authority
 Public Safety Communications 
 Emergency Communication and Public Safety Answering Point Personnel, including dispatchers and technicians
 Other Sworn and Civilian Personnel 
 Court Officers
 Other Police or Peace Officers
 Support of Civilian Staff for any of the above services, agencies or facilities

Corrections

 State Department of Corrections and Community Supervision Personnel, including correction and parole officers
 Local Correctional Facilities, including correction officers
 Local Probation Departments, including probation officers
 State Juvenile Detention and Rehabilitation Facilities
 Local Juvenile Detention and Rehabilitation Facilities

P-12 Schools, College and Child Care

 P-12 school or school district faculty or staff (includes all teachers, substitute teachers, student teachers, school administrators, paraprofessional staff and support staff including bus drivers)
 Contractors working in a P-12 school or school district (including contracted bus drivers)
 In-person college instructors
 Licensed, registered, approved or legally exempt group child care
 Licensed, registered, approved or legally exempt group child care providers
 Employees or support staff of licensed or registered child care setting
 Licensed, registered, approved or legally exempt child care providers

Public Transit

 Airline and airport employees
 Passenger railroad employees
 Subway and mass transit employees (MTA, LIRR, Metro North, NYC Transit, Upstate Transit)
 Ferry employees
 Port Authority employees
 Public bus employees
Public facing grocery store workers, including convenience store and bodega workers

Homeless Shelters

 Individual living in a homeless shelter where sleeping, bathing or eating accommodations must be shared with individuals and families who are not part of your household
 Individual working (paid or unpaid) in a homeless shelter where sleeping, bathing or eating accommodations must be shared by individuals and families who are not part of the same household, in a position where there is potential for interaction with shelter residents

Other Front Line Workers

 High-risk hospital and FQHC staff, including OMH psychiatric centers
 Health care or other high-risk essential staff who come into contact with residents/patients working in LTCFs and long-term, congregate settings overseen by OPWDD, OMH, OCFS, OTDA and OASAS, and residents in congregate living situations, overseen or funded by the OPWDD, OMH, OCFS, OTDA and OASAS
 Certified NYS EMS provider, including but not limited to Certified First Responder, Emergency Medical Technician, Advanced Emergency Medical Technician, Emergency Medical Technician – Critical Care, Paramedic, Ambulance Emergency Vehicle Operator, or Non-Certified Ambulance Assistant
 County Coroner or Medical Examiner, or employer or contractor thereof who is exposed to infectious material or bodily fluids
 Licensed funeral director, or owner, operator, employee, or contractor of a funeral firm licensed and registered in New York State, who is exposed to infectious material or bodily fluids
 Staff of urgent care provider
 Staff who administer COVID-19 vaccine
 All Outpatient/Ambulatory front-line, high-risk health care workers of any age who provide direct in-person patient care, or other staff in a position in which they have direct contact with patients (i.e., intake staff)
 All front-line, high-risk public health workers who have direct contact with patients, including those conducting COVID-19 tests, handling COVID-19 specimens and COVID-19 vaccinations
 Home care workers and aides, hospice workers, personal care aides, and consumer-directed personal care workers
 Staff and residents of nursing homes, skilled nursing facilities, and adult care facilities

Other Workers

 Restaurant workers
 Restaurant delivery drivers
 For-hire vehicle drivers, including taxi, livery, black car, and transportation network company drivers
Public facing hotel workers
Public-facing government and public employees
Not-for-profit workers who provide public-facing services to New Yorkers in need
Essential in-person public-facing building service workers

Phase 1C

 People 65 to 74 (since January 12, 2021),
 Adult New Yorkers of any age with the following conditions qualify for the vaccine: (started on February 15, 2021)
 Cancer (current or in remission, including 9/11-related cancers)
 Chronic kidney disease
 Pulmonary Disease, including but not limited to, COPD (chronic obstructive pulmonary disease), asthma (moderate-to-severe), pulmonary fibrosis, cystic fibrosis, and 9/11 related pulmonary diseases
 Intellectual and Developmental Disabilities including Down Syndrome
 Heart conditions, including but not limited to heart failure, coronary artery disease, cardiomyopathies, or hypertension (high blood pressure)
 Immunocompromised state (weakened immune system) including but not limited to solid organ transplant or from blood or bone marrow transplant, immune deficiencies, HIV, use of corticosteroids, use of other immune weakening medicines, or other causes
 Severe Obesity (BMI ≥ 40 kg/m2), Obesity (BMI 30–39.9 kg/m2)
 Pregnancy
 Sickle cell disease or Thalassemia
 Type 1 or 2 diabetes mellitus 
 Cerebrovascular disease (affects blood vessels and blood supply to the brain)
 Neurologic conditions including but not limited to Alzheimer's Disease or dementia
 Liver disease
 All other essential workers (to be determined by New York State)
Since March 10, 2021, people aged 60 and above can get vaccinated in New York State.

Since March 17, 2021, the following essential workers are also eligible:

 Public-facing government and public employee
 Not-for-profit workers who provide public-facing services to New Yorkers in need
 Essential in-person public-facing building service workers

Since March 23, 2021, people aged 50 and above can get vaccinated in New York State.

Since March 30, 2021, people aged 30 and above can get vaccinated in New York State.

Since April 6, 2021, people aged 16 and above can schedule appointments and get vaccinated in New York State.

Since May 13, 2021, people aged 12 and above can get vaccinated in New York State.

As of September 27, 2021, healthcare workers in New York State will be required to have had at least their first dose of the vaccine.

As a reminder, in excess of 90% of deaths in New York are either people above 60 years of age and people with underlying medical conditions. At the start of NYS vaccination program, there was  no clear process for people with underlying medical conditions. Some other countries (e.g., UK) were prioritizing people at highest risk for serious illness or death. The situation and decisions started to be altered after February 8, 2021, when the governor agreed to give access to vaccination for people with co-morbidities.

The governor and the mayor have opened new vaccination sites and have staffed these sites with anyone who is trained to give shots. It will likely accelerate vaccinations dramatically.

As patients with co-morbidities can be vaccinated since February 15, 2021, demand continues to exceed supply of vaccines significantly, stretching appointments into Spring 2021 for the population that can get vaccinated.

At the end of February 2021 the access to vaccination appointment slots remained complicated in NYS. The governor of NYS and the mayor of NYC have decided to let separate groups (e.g., Walgreens, medical groups, state or city vaccination campuses) manage their own vaccination schedules. It creates opacity in identifying potential available slots and applying in time to these spots. Phone lines to organize appointments are often not reachable.  But Huge Ma, a New York software developer, has created an application that facilitates taking appointments for vaccines in NYS, turbovax.info, which connects to multiple sites offering vaccination appointments.

By the end of February 2021 there is a noticeable acceleration in the number of people getting vaccinated. In addition, the new J&J vaccine was approved on February 28, 2021. Its distribution has been accompanied by longer overnight opening hours at Yankee Stadium, Javits Center and the NY State Fair Grounds.

On March 9, 2021, Governor Cuomo further increased the number of people who can get vaccinated in New York State to include people above 60 years.

Despite efforts at Governor's and NYC's level, the lack of proper organization is strongly felt and has relegated NYS at the 37th position in the US for the number of people vaccinated as updated by Johns Hopkins.

On March 22, 2021, Governor Cuomo lowered the minimum age to be vaccinated to 50 years and pharmacies are allowed to vaccinate almost eligible New Yorkers.

By March 29, 2021, Governor Cuomo extended vaccination population to 30 years old and announced that, as of April 6, everyone 16 years old and above can be vaccinated.

On May 12, 2021, Governor Cuomo announced that vaccination was now open to anyone aged 12 to 17 years old in New York State, in agreement with CDC's recommendations.

Since the beginning of May, the vaccination pace had started to flatten which was likely to increase the time to herd immunity. For example, during the week finishing April 14, New York state registered 939,221 people who received a first vaccination. During the week finishing July 27, New York State registered 117,795 people who received a first vaccination. It represented an 87.5% reduction.

On December 20, 2021, Governor Hochul announced New York State would provide $65 million to county governments in part to finance booster efforts.

Impact on voting
The New York State Democratic presidential primary—along with special elections in the 27th congressional district; the 50th senate district; and the 12th, 31st, and 136th assembly districts—were originally scheduled for April 28. On March 13, 2020, Senator Skoufis proposed legislation to move these elections to June 23. The intent was to mitigate the spread of the coronavirus. On March 28, the New York State Board of Elections and Governor Cuomo postponed the elections to June 23. Subsequently, the Democratic presidential primary was canceled altogether, and most of the special elections were postponed until the general election in November.

Democratic presidential primary

On April 27, 2020, the Board of Elections changed its decision, and cancelled the Democratic presidential primary outright, by removing several candidates who suspended their campaigns from the ballot. The decision was first criticized by supporters of presidential candidate, Senator Bernie Sanders, who hoped to secure additional convention delegates, which would allow greater influence in the Democratic Party's platform. Other critics of the decision cited reduced voter turn out for down-ballot races, which unfairly benefits incumbent candidates. New York State Democratic Party Chair, Jay Jacobs, stated "our motivation right now is to avoid what happened in Wisconsin, where we in this situation are holding a primary that asks poll workers, many of them senior citizens, to risk their health for no particular purpose." Despite this move 42 of 62 New York counties, roughly 68% of counties in the New York State, would remain open for voting due to Congressional and State elections. At the time New York was the only state to cancel its presidential primary.

The decision was overturned on May 5 by Federal District Court Judge Analisa Torres in New York's Southern District, when presidential candidate Andrew Yang filed suit against the Board of Elections, asserting that the decision violated the 1st and 14th Amendments to the United States Constitution. Judge Torres stated "...the Democratic Commissioners' April 27 Resolution removing Yang, Sanders, and eight other Democratic presidential candidates from the ballot deprived them of associational rights under the First and Fourteenth Amendments to the Constitution."

An appeal was filed by the Board of Elections with the US Court of Appeals, Second Circuit. On May 19, it was ruled that the presidential primary could proceed as planned. The Board of Elections Co-chair, Douglas Kellner, said the Board would not pursue further appeals.

Absentee voting
On March 22, 2020, Attorney General Leticia James called for automatic absentee voting in the New York Democratic presidential primary. Cuomo later announced that he would investigate if his recently expanded executive powers would allow him to expand absentee ballot access. On April 9, by executive order of the Governor, all New York State residents were granted the right to apply for an absentee ballot using the state's online absentee ballot application in order to facilitate safe voting in the primary elections. As stated in the order, all voters would be required to "check the box for 'Temporary illness or physical disability' with no requirement for in-person signature or appearance to be able to access an absentee ballot." In an effort to ease barriers to access, Cuomo announced on April 24 that postage paid absentee ballot applications would be mailed to all registered voters in the State. Voters can still apply for a ballot online, or opt to vote in person.

State and local elections

Filings for independent nominations to petitions were postponed beginning March 31, 2020. On April 25 special elections were cancelled for the 50th senate district, and the 12th, 31st and 136th assembly districts, as well as the Queens Borough President and New York City Council District 37. These vacancies are to be filled in the November General Election. The 27th Congressional district special election was not cancelled.

Effect on communities

Lack of enforcement of self-quarantine policies
Self-quarantines for persons who test positive or are symptomatic are not enforced due to a lack of resources. Several New York City area nurses expressed concerns that patients are not complying with self-quarantine guidelines, due to financial necessity or fear of losing their jobs. A New York State Nurses Association board member expressed concern that low-income patients who share rooms with other individuals may not be able to effectively self-isolate at their residences.

Implementation in Hasidic communities
Implementing social distancing has been difficult in some communities dominated by Hasidic Jews. On March 19, 2020, the Orange County village of Kiryas Joel, home to 25,000 Satmar Hasidim, closed all 100 of its synagogues, as well as schools and mikvot, despite the centrality of religious observance in the community. It was estimated that 25–28 percent of its residents had tested positive, including the community's 73-year-old spiritual leader, Grand Rebbe Aaron Teitelbaum. On March 27, the county reported that Kiryas Joel, within the town of Palm Tree, had 234 confirmed cases, the most of any municipality in the county.

Some reports suggested that the Hasidic community has generally been slow to implement measures designed to slow the spread of the virus. This reportedly led to one antisemitic incident. On March 23, a car dealership near Kiryas Joel refused to service a resident's car, telling him he had the virus.

An Orthodox Jewish physician, Vladimir Zelenko, who sees patients at his offices in both Kiryas Joel and Monsey, another predominantly Hasidic community in nearby Rockland County, claims that the real infection rate in Kiryas Joel is much higher. This has been disputed by local authorities. Zelenko, who had to self-isolate since he is missing a lung, said in daily YouTube videos that his office treated 500 patients (mostly in Kiryas Joel) for COVID-19, using the combination of hydroxychloroquine, azithromycin, and zinc sulfate, which has in some trials yielded positive results in reducing symptoms. Zelenko claimed that 90 percent of the Hasidic community will become infected; the county's health commissioner and the village's emergency services department disputed that, pointing out that it was based on nine positive results out of 14 samples.

By April 9, Palm Tree had reported 428 cases, maintaining its lead among Orange County's municipalities, a lead it lost a week later. Leaders of the surrounding towns and villages repeated an earlier call by county executive Steve Neuhaus for the town to be declared a containment zone as the area of New Rochelle where a cluster had been identified a month earlier had been, a request denied at that time by Cuomo since the stay-at-home order for the entire state was more restrictive. The Orthodox Jewish Public Affairs Council had responded to such pressure by calling on local leadership to "stop scapegoating Jews of KJ when the problem is clearly widespread, and worse, everywhere in [the] county."

On October 12, Hasidic activist and City Council candidate Heshy Tischler was arrested for inciting a riot and unlawful imprisonment. Hundreds marched through the neighborhood of Borough Park, burning masks, chanting "Jewish Lives Matter" and attacking passersby.

Police and crime
At the beginning of March 2020, prior to the confirmation of the first case of COVID-19, and the onset of the coronavirus pandemic in New York City, a 20 percent spike in crime for the first two months of 2020 was reported. After movement in the city became restricted, New York City Police Commissioner Dermot Shea stated that the pandemic had curtailed crime. At the end of March, Shea said that crime had decreased sharply during the epidemic (other than car theft, which increased markedly), though there is concern that domestic violence was not being reported. As of April 8, 2,103 uniformed members and 373 civilian members had tested positive for the virus while 13 had died.

In early April, the state's Division of Criminal Justice Services reported that crime had dropped considerably since late February, both in the city and state compared to the same period the year before. In the city, combined felony and misdemeanor arrests were down 43 percent, with the rest of the state recording a 69 percent drop. Cuomo praised the drop as a result of social distancing, since it helped keep hospitals and first responders free to deal with the pandemic.

Tensions over city residents relocating to rural areas
Some residents of New York City and its inner suburbs who own, or can afford to rent, property in rural areas upstate or on eastern Long Island have aroused local resentment for doing so during the pandemic. Steve McLaughlin, executive of Rensselaer County, east of Albany, asked Cuomo to issue an order banning all non-essential travel upstate from the city, after city residents booked all available local lodging. Seven of 51 cases the county had as of April 2 were city residents, and the county feared it did not have sufficient healthcare infrastructure to handle a large outbreak; McLaughlin issued an order requiring any recent arrivals from the city to quarantine themselves for 14 days, during which law enforcement will check on them regularly.

Similarly, Greene County, in the Catskills just south of Albany, posted on its website a letter asking people to refrain from traveling there, especially from New York City or Westchester. "There is no hospital in Greene County," wrote the chairman of the county legislature. "This limits our ability to serve a large number of people requiring higher levels of care for COVID-19 patients and other illnesses." The legislatures of neighboring Delaware and Sullivan counties made similar requests.

In the Hamptons, on the eastern end of Long Island's South Fork, a longtime summer destination for city residents, rental rates have quadrupled as the population has nearly doubled. While many year-round residents are aware that the towns' economy depends on seasonal residents, they believe their resources have been stretched to the limit. "People need to stop coming out east. We're full," one woman wrote on a local newspaper's Facebook page.

New York renters and homeowners
Cuomo initially announced a state moratorium for both residential and commercial evictions on March 20, 2020. This moratorium was an attempt to prevent evictions during the height of the COVID-19 public health emergency. He then signed the Tenant Safe Harbor Act, which had passed the New York State Senate and New York State Assembly on May 27, into law on June 30. The Tenant Safe Harbor Act gave an additional layer of protection to tenants experiencing financial hardship during the public health emergency, as it prevented courts from ever evicting on the basis of non-payment that accrued or came due during the COVID-19 period. Previously, a tenant who was unable to pay rent could be evicted on the basis of non-payment as soon as the moratorium ended. On September 28, Cuomo announced the Tenant Safe Harbor Act would be extended and expanded through January 1, 2021.

In addition to the Tenant Safe Harbor Act, Cuomo signed the COVID-19 Emergency Eviction and Foreclosure Prevention Act of 2020 into effect on December 28. This piece of legislation further safeguards New York renters and homeowners and ensures they can remain in their homes. The Act suspends residential eviction and residential foreclosure proceedings until May 1, 2021, and allows renters and homeowners to submit a declaration of hardship. The Act also prevents credit discrimination, and negative credit reporting due to the COVID-19 pandemic.

Impact on sports

Most of the state's sports teams were affected. Major League Baseball cancelled the remainder of spring training on March 12, 2020, and on March 16 it announced that the season will be postponed indefinitely, after the recommendation from the CDC to restrict events of more than 50 people for the next eight weeks, affecting the New York Yankees and New York Mets. The National Basketball Association suspended the season for 30 days starting March 12, affecting the New York Knicks and Brooklyn Nets. The National Hockey League season was suspended indefinitely on March 12, affecting the New York Rangers, New York Islanders, and Buffalo Sabres. Major League Soccer postponed the season for 30 days starting March 12, affecting the New York Red Bulls and New York City FC. On March 12, the National Lacrosse League postponed the remainder of their season until further notice, affecting the seasons of the Buffalo Bandits, Rochester Knighthawks, and New York Riptide. The XFL suspended its season on March 12, affecting the inaugural season of the New York Guardians.

In college sports, the National Collegiate Athletic Association cancelled all winter and spring tournaments, most notably the Division I men's and women's basketball tournaments, affecting colleges and universities statewide. On March 16, the National Junior College Athletic Association also canceled the remainder of the winter seasons as well as the spring seasons.

The state's high school basketball playoffs had begun in early March with no spectators allowed. On March 12, the New York State Public High School Athletic Association (NYSPHSAA) suspended remaining winter sports championship contests in all sports that still had not decided them: boys' and girls' basketball, ice hockey, and bowling.

On March 17, four members of the Brooklyn Nets, including Kevin Durant, were confirmed positive for COVID-19.

A little over a month later, NYSPSHSAA announced that Sections 8 and 11, which cover all of Long Island's high schools, had voted to cancel all spring high school and middle school sports seasons. "It was not an easy [decision] to make," said Section 11 executive director Tom Combs, "however, in what the world is experiencing at this time, it is the most reasonable and prudent decision to make." The other nine sections of the state, in areas which in some cases were not experiencing the pandemic so severely, had not made decisions yet and were still planning for the possibility of a short spring season at the end of May and in early June. Championships for any spring sports, were they to be held, would likely have to be moved to other locations since they had been scheduled to be played on Long Island; on April 27, they were canceled.

At the beginning of May, when Cuomo announced that the remainder of the school year in the state was canceled, all remaining contingency plans for spring high school sports statewide were canceled as well.

In mid-May, Cuomo announced that horse racing statewide and auto races at Watkins Glen International in Schuyler County may resume, with no spectators allowed, at the beginning of June. The NASCAR race weekend scheduled for Watkins Glen International in August was cancelled due to New York's 14-day quarantine requirement for out-of-state travelers coming from states with a high rate of COVID-19 cases; this includes North Carolina and Florida, where many drivers and teams in NASCAR are based. The race weekend at Watkins Glen International was replaced by the road course at Daytona International Speedway in Daytona Beach, Florida.

On June 20, Cuomo announced that the Yankees and the Mets baseball teams would move from conducting spring training in Florida to New York. The Yankees will be at Yankee Stadium and the Mets at Citi Field. Cuomo added that, "[...] we've determined it's possible for the Yankees and the Mets to safely conduct spring training in the state this year and are thrilled to begin reopening America's national pastime right here in New York."

On July 24, Governor Cuomo virtually officiated the start of the Mets home opener at Citi Stadium against the Atlanta Braves with no fans in attendance.

On July 31, the Yankees held their home opener game at Yankee Stadium against the Boston Red Sox with no fans in attendance.

On August 31, the 2020 US Open (tennis) kicked off with various safety precautions and void of spectators due to COVID-19, for the first time in the tournament's history.

Impact on outdoor recreation
The ban on large gatherings meant that the annual "First Cast" ceremony at the Junction Pool, a popular fly fishing spot, in the Sullivan County hamlet of Roscoe, marking the April 1 opening of trout season, could not be held. The season still opened and the state's Department of Environmental Conservation (DEC) encouraged anglers to take to the state's streams as long as they continued to practice social distancing. Many stores in Roscoe that catered to them were nevertheless closed and limited to filling orders online. Anglers in Central New York reported that day that they were able to easily maintain social distancing while in the waters of Ninemile Creek, a practice necessary to the sport in any event since it prevented them from getting their lines tangled with each other. They appreciated the opportunity to get outside on a day with good weather for fishing and forget the pandemic, and some told the Syracuse Post-Standard they had good catches as well.

DEC announced on April 7 that the state's spring wild turkey hunting season in May, and the youth turkey weekend at the end of April, were still going on. It advised hunters, in addition to the usual hunting safety practices, to continue social distancing while hunting and take other measures, such as buying supplies online and hunting close to home. Hunters were further advised to share blinds with other hunters only if they lived in the same residence, and to hunt alone where possible.

Park closures and use restrictions

On April 7, 2020, Rockland and Sullivan counties closed their parks. Residents had been making heavy use of them during the lockdown, making it difficult to enforce social distancing. The closures will last for two weeks and be re-evaluated at the end of that period. A week later the Palisades Interstate Park Commission (PIPC) closed Nyack Beach and Rockland Lake state parks in Rockland County; local and county government officials had urged the move since the parks had grown crowded with visitors on recent warm days after the county and its towns closed their own parks. "While this is a tough call it is the right thing to do short term," said county executive Ed Day, who said the decision would be reviewed in two weeks.

On April 9, Cuomo removed golf courses, boat launches and marinas from the list of essential businesses allowed to remain open, forcing all courses in the state of New York to close until at least April 29. The move was a result of New Jersey and Pennsylvania having ordered courses to close, resulting in crowding at New York's courses near borders with those states. On April 18, Empire State Development modified that order to allow courses to open as long as no employees such as caddies were on the course, meaning golfers must carry their own bags and cannot use carts; three weeks later that order was again modified to allow the use of carts as a reasonable accommodation for disabled golfers, per the Americans with Disabilities Act.

The Rockland County park closures were supplemented April 24 by the PIPC's closure of all roads through Bear Mountain and Harriman state parks, where the Anthony Wayne Recreation Area has been serving as a testing site, save Seven Lakes Drive, and exits that led to those roads from Palisades Interstate Parkway, in not only Rockland but neighboring Orange County. Trail shelters were also closed, although backpackers were still allowed to set up camp within  of the shelters. Permitholders are still allowed to boat on the parks' lakes; sales of new permits are suspended through May 7.

In Ulster County, parking lots at Minnewaska State Park Preserve in the Shawangunks have been limited to 50 percent of capacity to prevent overcrowding. All recreational activities within the park other than foot travel and motorless bicycling have been prohibited, including climbing and bouldering. Restrooms within the park have been closed as well.

In Dutchess, Putnam and Westchester counties, many popular trails and trailheads alongside the Hudson River in Hudson Highlands State Park have been closed since hikers arriving by car or Metro-North's Hudson Line trains must walk on the side of narrow roads and thus cannot keep six feet apart. Among them are all trails on Breakneck Ridge and Bull Hill north of Cold Spring.

In the Catskill Mountains, DEC announced April 5 it was closing the trail and viewing platforms at Kaaterskill Falls in Greene County, which also attract many hikers to a small space. All fire towers on state land in the Catskill Park have been closed. DEC has also suspended overnight camping at easily accessible and popular locations around the state, and stopped issuing permits for backcountry camping by groups larger than 10, or for more than three days.

New York City's Department of Environmental Protection, which operates the reservoirs of the city's water supply system, announced that recreational boating season on its four Catskill reservoirs, which normally begins May 1, will be postponed to May 23. Fishing from rowboats and the shoreline is still permitted.

Statistics
Initially, under Governor Cuomo, New York counted only those COVID-19 deaths that occurred in hospitals, nursing homes, and adult care facilities. This excluded people who died at home or in other locations. Following Cuomo's resignation, beginning on August 24, 2021, New York began using the death certificate data provided to the CDC, which includes deaths in any location within the state. This increased New York's death toll by nearly 12,000; the newly totaled number of deaths up to that point was 55,395.

Demographics
Following a USA Today article in early April suggesting the states could release demographic breakdowns of victims, New York published information on the age of those who had died of COVID-19. Nearly two-thirds of the dead were over 60 years old. It also included a breakdown by county, information that in some cases differed with that released by the individual county health departments. Later data showed that 61 percent of the dead were men, that 86 percent had underlying health conditions such as hypertension and diabetes that are known to increase the possibility that COVID-19 will be fatal, and that African American and Latino patients in the state outside of New York City accounted for a greater share of the deaths from the disease than their share of the overall population (data from New York City was not available at the time). Demographics of COVID-19 fatalities continue to be updated on the state's COVID-19 tracker website.

Graphs
Note: As the New York State Department of Health is not reporting data in compliance with CDC recommendations, the below charts use only data validated by Johns Hopkins University.

Daily cases

Daily deaths

Note: Per NYDOH, the spike for June 30 in the above chart is due to a comprehensive accounting of current and retrospective data, provided by nursing homes and adult care facilities. These data capture COVID-19 confirmed and COVID-19 presumed deaths within these facilities. These data do not reflect COVID-19 confirmed or COVID-19 presumed positive deaths that occurred outside of the facility. This number includes retrospective data from reporting that dates back to March 1, 2020.

Total cases

Total deaths

See also
 Timeline of the COVID-19 pandemic in the United States
 COVID-19 pandemic in New York City - for impact in New York City
 COVID-19 pandemic in the United States – for impact on the country
 COVID-19 pandemic in North America – for impact on the continent
 COVID-19 pandemic – for impact on other countries
 New York COVID-19 nursing home scandal

References

External links

 Coronavirus information from the New York State Department of Health
 COVID-19 County-level Projections

 
New York
Coronavirus pandemic
Coronavirus pandemic
Disasters in New York (state)
Health in New York (state)